E. Grady Jolly (born October 3, 1937) is a senior United States circuit judge of the United States Court of Appeals for the Fifth Circuit. His chambers are in Jackson, Mississippi.

Education and career

Jolly was born in Louisville, Mississippi. He received a Bachelor of Arts degree from the University of Mississippi in 1959 and a Bachelor of Laws from the University of Mississippi Law School in 1962. He was a trial attorney for the National Labor Relations Board in Winston-Salem, North Carolina from 1962 to 1964, an Assistant United States Attorney for the Northern District of Mississippi from 1964 to 1967, and a lawyer for the Tax Division of the United States Department of Justice from 1967 to 1969. In 1969 he entered private practice in Jackson, Mississippi.

Federal judicial service

Jolly was nominated by President Ronald Reagan on July 1, 1982, to the United States Court of Appeals for the Fifth Circuit, to a seat vacated by Judge James P. Coleman. He was confirmed by the United States Senate on July 27, 1982, and received commission on July 30, 1982. Jolly assumed senior status on October 3, 2017.

Notable cases

In July 1986, Jolly wrote the opinion for a unanimous three-judge panel that held Louisiana's law requiring schools to teach creationism alongside evolution was an unconstitutional violation of the Establishment Clause. The decision was affirmed by the Supreme Court in Edwards v. Aguillard.

In July 2014, Jolly wrote the 2–1 majority opinion in Jackson Women's Health Organization v. Currier, which allowed Mississippi's sole abortion clinic to remain open. Jolly stated that a state law which would have shut down the clinic because its doctors were unable to obtain privileges at a local hospital would have violated Mississippi women's rights to seek abortions within their state's borders.

References

External links
 

1937 births
Living people
Assistant United States Attorneys
Judges of the United States Court of Appeals for the Fifth Circuit
Lawyers from Jackson, Mississippi
People from Louisville, Mississippi
United States court of appeals judges appointed by Ronald Reagan
University of Mississippi School of Law alumni
20th-century American judges